Pitanga is the third studio album by Brazilian singer-songwriter Mallu Magalhães, released September 30, 2011.

Track listing
 "Velha e Louca"
 "Cena"
 "Sambinha Bom"
 "Olha Só, Moreno"
 "Youhuhu"
 "Por Que Você Faz Assim Comigo?"
 "Baby, I'm Sure"
 "In The Morning"
 "Lonely"
 "Highly Sensitive"
 "Ô, Ana"
 "Cais"

Chart positions

References 

The information in this article is based on that in its Portuguese equivalent.

2011 albums
Mallu Magalhães albums
Sony Music albums